The 2001 Lamar Hunt U.S. Open Cup ran from June through October 2001, open to all soccer teams in the United States.

The Los Angeles Galaxy won the tournament with a 2–1 victory over the New England Revolution in extra time in the final at Titan Stadium on the campus of Cal State-Fullerton.

Four MLS squads were upset in the second round. However, one team that held on was the San Jose Earthquakes, who won 7–6 on penalties in the third round against the Milwaukee Rampage, then in the quarterfinals lost to their California rival Los Angeles, but not before an exciting game that in the end saw penalties from all ten position players. LA won 10–9 on PKs after a 1–1 draw. The Seattle Sounders Select had the best performance by a PDL team, defeating the Dallas Burn in extra time in the second round, then lost to the eventual champion Los Angeles 3–1.  The farthest run by a lower-division team was accomplished by the Pittsburgh Riverhounds, who lost to the Chicago Fire in the quarterfinals in extra time.

Open Cup bracket
Home teams listed on top of bracket

Schedule
Note: Scorelines use the standard U.S. convention of placing the home team on the right-hand side of box scores.

First round
Four PDL and four USASA teams start.

Second round
Twelve MLS, Eleven A-League, and Five D3 Pro League teams enter.

Third round

Quarterfinals

Semifinals

Final

Top scorers

See also
 United States Soccer Federation
 Lamar Hunt U.S. Open Cup
 Major League Soccer
 United Soccer Leagues
 USASA
 National Premier Soccer League

2001 domestic association football cups
Cup
2001